Robert Lowry Goulet is a marketing sports agent who managed the career of two-time U.S. Open Champion, Ernie Els, and was responsible for handling Ernie Els’ day-to-day business affairs on behalf of Legends Inc of South Africa. During this time, Goulet managed Els in the United States as he won the 1997 U.S. Open at the Congressional Country Club.

Goulet previously represented the marketing affairs for top professional golfers including Phil Mickelson, David Toms, Larry Mize, Corey Pavin, Bob Tway, Rocco Mediate, and Larry Nelson during his tenure as the Director of Marketing for Cornerstone Sports, Inc. from 1990-1995. Rob has been the agent for LPGA Tour golfer Kris Tschetter since 1992.

Mr. Goulet is also credited as co-creator of VH1’s successful Fairway to Heaven Invitational charitable golf event starting in 1994.  Rock stars and celebrities including Bill Murray, Glenn Frey, Hootie and the Blowfish, Sheryl Crow, Alice Cooper, Bill Berry, Mike Mills of R.E.M., Tico Torres, David Bryan of Bon Jovi, get together to swing golf clubs at this cable TV-sponsored event that usually tags onto the Las Vegas Invitational in October.

References

External links
  Inside The Ropes: Els and Whiskey Creek Enjoy Successful Grand Opening
 Kris Tschetter Bio
Kris Tschetter Bio from the LPGA Tour
 Cornerstone Sports
Cornerstone Sports founder and company timeline

American sports agents
Florida Southern College alumni
Living people
Place of birth missing (living people)
Year of birth missing (living people)